The File of the Golden Goose is a 1969 British neo noir thriller film directed by Sam Wanamaker and starring Yul Brynner, Charles Gray and Edward Woodward. Its plot involves an American detective being sent to Britain to track down a major international criminal.

It is a reworking of the 1947 American film noir T-Men, directed by Anthony Mann.

Plot summary

A trail of counterfeit hundred dollar bills has been discovered in several places around the world. When this comes to the attention of the Secret Service, they assign one of their top men, Pete Novak (Yul Brynner), to the case of finding out who is producing and distributing them.

Pete realizes that this is an assignment that demands his full attention, so he immediately breaks up with his girlfriend in preparation for the journey he must take. Before Pete can even begin his search, he is ambushed by a gang of hoodlums trying to shoot him down as they drive by outside his home. He concludes that the gang must have been tipped off by someone on the inside of the service about his new assignment. He manages to kill them, but discovers afterwards that the killers have accidentally shot and killed his ex-girlfriend in the process.

The killing of the girlfriend makes the whole assignment very personal for Pete. To begin the search for the counterfeit distributor, he travels across the Atlantic to London, England, to visit Scotland Yard headquarters, since they are in charge of the counterfeit investigation in Europe. There, he meets up with Superintendent Sloane (John Barrie) of the Yard, who arranges for him to be partnered by an investigator by the name of Arthur Thompson (Edward Woodward). Arthur is a very happily married jolly old copper, who manages to ignore all of Pete’s remarks about the inappropriateness of being a married man working as an agent or policeman.

Pete and Arthur start infiltrating the counterfeit organization, posing as members of the Golden Goose gang - a gang that has been all but erased from the face of the earth by the police. They use their fake identities to hide their undercover infiltration from the head of the illegal operation, The Owl Harrison (Charles Gray), and are ultimately successful in stopping the counterfeit operation.

Cast
 Yul Brynner - Peter Novak
 Charles Gray - Harrison
 Edward Woodward - Arthur Thompson
 John Barrie - Superintendent Sloane
 Adrienne Corri - Angela 'Tina' Richmond
 Graham Crowden - Smythe
 Walter Gotell - George Leeds
 Anthony Jacobs - Firenos
 Ivor Dean - Reynolds
 Debbie Searle - Arthur Thompson's Daughter
 Hugh McDermott - Ray Moss
 Hilary Heath - Ann Marlowe
 Ken Jones - Stroud
 Karel Štěpánek - Mueller
 Bernard Archard - Collins
 Geoffrey Reed - Martin

The narrator (uncredited) was Patrick Allen.

References

External links
 

1969 films
1960s crime thriller films
British crime thriller films
1960s English-language films
Films directed by Sam Wanamaker
United Artists films
Films produced by Edward Small
Counterfeit money in film
1960s British films